Tamsin Greenway (born 6 October 1982) is a former England netball international. She was a member of the England teams that won bronze medals at the 2010 Commonwealth Games and at the 2011 and 2015 Netball World Cups. Between 2006 and 2018 she played in eight Netball Superleague grand finals for three different teams – Team Bath, Surrey Storm and Wasps. During this time she won five Netball Superleague titles as a player and/or coach and a sixth as a director of netball. Greenway also works as a netball pundit for Sky Sports. In 2020, she was appointed head coach of the Scotland national netball team.

Early life and education
Greenway is originally from Desford, Leicestershire. She was educated at the local community primary school and Bosworth Academy. In addition to netball, in her youth she played various sports including association football, tennis, table tennis, badminton and field hockey. Between 2001 and 2004 she studied Media Production at the University of Bath.

Playing career

Team Bath
Between 2003 and 2009 Greenway played for Team Bath. In 2004, she was a member of the Team Bath squad that won the Super Cup. In 2005–06 she was a member of the Team Bath squad that won the inaugural Netball Superleague title. She was also a member of Team Bath squads that won further titles in 2006–07 and 2008–09. Along the way she also played in her first two Netball Superleague grand finals in 2006 and 2007. Her team mates at Team Bath included, among others, Sara Bayman, Rachel Dunn, Jess Garland, Pamela Cookey, Stacey Francis and Geva Mentor.

Queensland Firebirds
In 2008 and 2009 Greenway played for Queensland Firebirds in the ANZ Championship.

Surrey Storm
Between 2010 and 2015, Greenway played for Surrey Storm. Greenway served Surrey Storm as team captain, player/coach and director of netball. Under her leadership Surrey Storm played in five out of the six Netball Superleague grand finals between 2011 and 2016. After finishing as runners up in the first three, Surrey Storm won their first Netball Superleague title in 2015 and then retained the title in 2016. In 2015, Greenway initially announced she was retiring as a player.

Wasps
In 2016, Greenway was appointed as the first director of netball for new Netball Superleague franchise, Wasps. Greenway guided Wasps to two successive Superleague titles in 2017 and 2018. She also came out of retirement as a player and played in two further grands finals. Her Wasps team mates included Rachel Dunn, Bongiwe Msomi, Natalie Haythornthwaite, Samantha May and Jade Clarke. In July 2018, Greenway announced she was stepping down as Wasps director of netball.

England
Between 2004 and 2015 Greenway made 67 senior appearances for England. She made her senior debut during a series against South Africa. She previously represented England at under-19 and university levels. She subsequently represented England at the 2007 World Netball Championships. She was a member of the England teams that won bronze medals at the 2010 Commonwealth Games and at the 2011 and 2015 Netball World Cups. She was also a member of the England team that won the silver medal at the 2010 World Netball Series.

Coaching career

Scotland
In February 2020, Greenway was appointed head coach of Scotland and appointed Sara Francis-Bayman as her assistant coach on 11th August 2021.

Television
Greenway works as a netball pundit for Sky Sports. In 2011, she appeared as a Leicester City F.C. fan in the Soccerette segment of Soccer AM. She has also appeared as a guest on A Question of Sport.

Personal life
Between 2012 and 2016 Greenway was in a relationship with the TV presenter Tim Lovejoy. They had a daughter together named Jamie Jeane Lovejoy (b. 2013). In November 2019, Greenway announced the birth of her second child, Casey Jaxx, with fiancé Jo Feldman.

Tamsin's best friends in netball include Sara Francis-Bayman (who she recently appointed as her assistant coach for the Thistles), Nat Haythornthwaite (who she played with at Wasps), Pamela Cookey, Rachel Dunn and Hannah Knights (who played with her at Surrey Storm).

Honours

Team Bath
Netball Superleague
Winners: 2005–06, 2006–07, 2008–09: 3
Super Cup
Winners: 2004
Surrey Storm
Netball Superleague
Winners: 2015, 2016: 2
Runners up: 2011, 2012, 2014: 3
Wasps Netball
Netball Superleague
Winners: 2017, 2018: 2
England
Fast5 Netball World Series
Runners Up: 2010

References

1982 births
Living people
English netball players
English netball coaches
Commonwealth Games bronze medallists for England
Netball players at the 2010 Commonwealth Games
Commonwealth Games medallists in netball
Netball Superleague players
AENA Super Cup players
Team Bath netball players
Surrey Storm players
Wasps Netball players
ANZ Championship players
Queensland Firebirds players
English expatriate netball people in Australia
Netball Superleague coaches
Scotland national netball team coaches
Alumni of the University of Bath
Sportspeople from Leicestershire
2011 World Netball Championships players
2015 Netball World Cup players
Medallists at the 2010 Commonwealth Games